Staffan Bo Strand (born 18 April 1976) is a Swedish former high jumper. He currently lives in Norrmalm in Stockholm with his wife since 2004 Tiffany.

Career
His personal best jump is 2.32 metres, achieved in July 2000 in Nice and in September 2000 at the Olympic Games in Sydney. He has an indoor personal best of 2.35 metres, achieved in June 2002 in Stockholm. 

Staffan was a 6-time Big Ten champion and 5-time All-American in his three years of competition for the University of Minnesota. He graduated with a Bachelor of Science in Computer Engineering with High Distinction and a Master of Science in Computer Engineering. Upon completing the master's degree, he started work on a PhD doing advanced research in Storage and Data Management.

In July 2008, Staffan Strand decided to retire from elite sports because his ankle could not cope with the hard training.

Achievements

Progression

References

External links

1976 births
Living people
People from Upplands Väsby Municipality
Swedish male high jumpers
Athletes (track and field) at the 2000 Summer Olympics
Athletes (track and field) at the 2004 Summer Olympics
Olympic athletes of Sweden
University of Minnesota College of Science and Engineering alumni
European Athletics Championships medalists
Sportspeople from Stockholm County